An artos is a loaf of bread used in Eastern Orthodox and Byzantine rite catholic church services.

Artos may also refer to:

 Mount Artos, Turkey
 Artos (drink), an Indian soft drink
 Rudi "Artos" Mackenzie, a major character in the Emberverse science fiction universe